Watercress Darter National Wildlife Refuge is a  National Wildlife Refuge located in Jefferson County, Alabama, within the city limits of Bessemer. Watercress Darter NWR consists of a  pond known as Thomas Spring which is essential to the survival of the endangered watercress darter. A second pond was built on the site in 1983. The facility is unstaffed, but is administered by the Mountain Longleaf National Wildlife Refuge in Anniston, Alabama.

Wildlife

The facility operates exclusively to protect the endangered watercress darter.

Facilities
The refuge is open to the public and offers limited opportunities for hiking and wildlife photography. Fishing is not permitted on the refuge for the protection of the watercress darter.

See also
 List of National Wildlife Refuges

References

External links
 Watercress Darter National Wildlife Refuge homepage
 Recreation.gov overview

National Wildlife Refuges in Alabama
Protected areas of Jefferson County, Alabama
1980 establishments in Alabama
Protected areas established in 1980